Charles Henry Adams (April 22, 1859 – June 5, 1952) was an American journalist and politician, who served as the mayor of Melrose, Massachusetts between 1915 and 1921.

Adams was the publisher of the Melrose Journal, and assistant business manager of The Boston Advertiser and The Boston Evening Record.

End notes 

1859 births
1952 deaths
Republican Party members of the Massachusetts House of Representatives
Mayors of Melrose, Massachusetts
People from Melrose, Massachusetts
American newspaper publishers (people)
Boston Daily Advertiser people
People from Rochester, New Hampshire